HtmlUnit is a headless web browser written in Java. It allows high-level manipulation of websites from other Java code, including filling and submitting forms and clicking hyperlinks. It also provides access to the structure and the details within received web pages. HtmlUnit emulates parts of browser behaviour including the lower-level aspects of TCP/IP and HTTP. A sequence such as getPage(url), getLinkWith("Click here"), click() allows a user to navigate through hypertext and obtain web pages that include HTML, JavaScript, Ajax and cookies. This headless browser can deal with HTTPS security, basic HTTP authentication, automatic page redirection and other HTTP headers. It allows Java test code to examine returned pages either as text, an XML DOM, or as collections of forms, tables, and links.

The goal is to simulate real browsers; namely Chrome, Firefox ESR 38, Internet Explorer 8 and 11, and Edge (experimental).

The most common use of HtmlUnit is test automation of web pages, but sometimes it can be used for web scraping, or downloading website content.

Benefits 
 Provides high-level API, taking away lower-level details away from the user.
 Compared to other WebDriver implementations, HtmlUnitDriver is the fastest to implement.
 It can be configured to simulate specific Browser.

Drawbacks 
 Elements layout and rendering can not be tested.
 The JavaScript support is still not complete.  And this is usually the main area of enhancements.

Used technologies 
 W3C DOM
 HTTP connection, using Apache HttpComponents
 JavaScript, using forked Rhino
 HTML Parsing, NekoHTML
 CSS: using CSS Parser
 XPath support, using Xalan

Libraries using HtmlUnit 
 Selenium WebDriver
 Spring MVC Test Framework
 Google Web Toolkit tests
 WebTest
 Wetator

See also 

 Headless system
 PhantomJS a headless WebKit with JavaScript API
 Web scraping
 Web testing
 xUnit
 River Trail
 Selenium WebDriver

References

Bibliography
  pp. 339–

Further reading
 Langer, A. "Extending HtmlUnit for test automatisation of Web applications using AJAX"; Betreuer/in (nen): T. Grechenig, M. Bernhart; 183/1, 2009.

External links 
 HtmlUnit

Unit testing frameworks
Java platform
Load testing tools
Web development
Free software programmed in Java (programming language)
Web browsers
Web scraping